The Param Vir Chakra (PVC) is India's highest military decoration, awarded for displaying distinguished acts of valour during wartime. Param Vir Chakra translates as the "Wheel of the Ultimate Brave", and the award is granted for "most conspicuous bravery in the presence of the enemy". , the medal has been awarded 21 times, of which 14 were posthumous and 16 arose from actions in Indo-Pakistani conflicts. Of the 21 awardees, 20 have been from the Indian Army, and one has been from the Indian Air Force. Major Somnath Sharma, was the first recipient. A number of state governments of India as well as ministries of the central government provide allowances and rewards to recipients of the PVC (or their family members in case of the recipient's death).

The history of present-day Indian gallantry awards can be traced back to the rule of the East India Company, when the first formal award was instituted by Lord William Bentinck in 1834 as the Order of Merit, later renamed the Indian Order of Merit in 1902. During the First World War, the British awards system was adopted and continued through the Second World War. Post-independence, new awards were instituted on 26January 1950, with retroactive effect from 15August 1947. The PVC is equivalent to the Victoria Cross in the United Kingdom and the Medal of Honor in the United States.

History
The history of modern-day Indian gallantry awards can be traced back to the rule of the East India Company. Gold medals were awarded to Indian officers for the first time in 1795, with the first recipient being Subedar Abdul Kader of the 5thMadras Native Infantry. The chain of the gold medal awarded to Kader was inscribed with the words "For Conduct and Courage on All Occasions". In 1834 the Order of Merit was established by the then Governor-General of India, Lord William Bentinck. The decoration was renamed the Indian Order of Merit (IOM) in 1902, and Indians considered it to be "the most coveted gallantry award" until the Victoria Cross (VC)—the highest award for gallantry in the British Empire—was extended to Indians in 1911. The VC was awarded to 153 Indian and British soldiers of the British Indian Army, and civilians under its command, from 1857 until Indian independence in 1947.

During the First World War, in addition to the IOM, the award system of the British Indian Army was expanded. Based on the British practice for recognising actions of gallantry, senior officers would be awarded the Distinguished Service Order, junior officers the Military Cross, and enlisted men with the Military Medal. This system continued through the Second World War.

Post-independence, the British honours and awards system in India informally came to an end. A short time later, Prime Minister of India Jawaharlal Nehru decided to give gallantry awards for the ongoing conflict in Jammu and Kashmir. Although India and Pakistan still had the option to award British honours, the leaders felt that it would not make sense to give the same honour to personnel from opposing forces. Accordingly, in June 1948 it was decided to institute new Indian awards for gallantry: the Param Vir Chakra(PVC), Maha Vir Chakra(MVC), and Vir Chakra(VrC). After the PVC, the MVC and VrC are the second and third highest gallantry awards during wartime.

Nehru entrusted the implementation of the PVC to Major General Hira Lal Atal, the first Indian adjutant general of India. He in turn requested Savitri Khanolkar, the wife of an Indian Army officer, Vikram Khanolkar of the Sikh Regiment, to design the medal for the PVC. Coincidentally, the first PVC would be awarded to Major Somnath Sharma, the brother-in-law of Khanolkar's daughter.

Despite gaining independence from British rule, India still remained a dominion of the United Kingdom. This meant that the Governor-General of India could not approve the establishment of the awards without assent from the British Crown. Therefore, a draft of the Royal Warrant was sent to London for approval by King George VI. However, by mid-1948 it became clear that the King's ratification would not be forthcoming for some time. As author Ian Cardozo suggests: "How could the King sanction awards for a war between two members of the Commonwealth? Also, the King would have not even have been a symbolic presence on the awards."

Therefore, the draft warrants to formally establish the new gallantry awards were not put into effect. On 1January 1949, a ceasefire was implemented in Jammu and Kashmir, and as it was becoming too late to honour acts of heroism from the 1947–1948 Indo-Pakistani War, Nehru forwarded the draft warrants to Governor-General Chakravarti Rajagopalachari to "institute the awards as your own". But Rajagopalachari felt that, as India was still a dominion, it would be inappropriate for him to establish the awards without the King's approval. He instead suggested to Nehru that, as India was to become a republic on 26January 1950, it would be appropriate to announce the establishment of the awards on that date, but with retroactive effect from 15August 1947.

On 26January 1950, now celebrated as Republic Day of India, the PVC was established by Rajendra Prasad, the first President of India, with effect from 15August 1947 (Independence Day of India). Provision was made in the event a PVC recipient was to receive a further award of the medal; if this were to arise, the recipient would receive a bar to their existing PVC, along with a gift of a replica of the vajra (club), the weapon of Indra, the god of heaven. , no instances of an individual being conferred with a second PVC have arisen. The medal carries with it the right to use "PVC" as a post-nominal.

Regulations
The regulations of the PVC were set out in The Gazette of India the day the award was established, 26 January 1950, as follows:

An amendment to the above regulations on 26 January 1980 saw Clause 12 deleted, and the remaining clauses renumbered accordingly.

Design specifications 

The name of the award translates as the "Wheel of the Ultimate Brave". The medal is a circular bronze disc  in diameter. On the obverse, or front, the National Emblem of India appears in the centre on a raised circle surrounded by four copies of the vajra, the weapon of Indra, the ancient Vedic king of the gods. The motif symbolizes the sacrifice of Rishi Dadhichi, who gave his bones to the gods to make the vajra to kill the demon Vritra. The medal is suspended from a straight-swiveling suspension bar. On the reverse, around a plain centre, are two legends separated by lotus flowers. The words "Param Vir Chakra" are written in Hindi and English.

Recipients

The PVC has been awarded 21 times, of which 14 were awarded posthumously and 16 arose from actions in Indo-Pakistani conflicts. Of the 21 awardees, 20 have been from the Indian Army, and one has been from the Indian Air Force. The Grenadiers, with three awards, have received the greatest number of Param Vir Chakras. The various Gorkha Rifle regiments of the Indian Army have received three awards, with the 1, 8, and 11 Gorkha Rifle regiments each having one PVC recipient.

, Flying Officer Nirmal Jit Singh Sekhon, who was awarded the Param Vir Chakra posthumously in 1971, is the only Indian Air Force officer to have been honoured with the medal. Subedar Major Bana Singh, Subedar Sanjay Kumar and Subedar Yogendra Singh Yadav, are the only living recipients of the award.

 ** Rank refers to rank held at time of award.

Allowances and rewards for the awardees
The PVC also carries a cash allowance for those under the rank of lieutenant (or the appropriate service equivalent), and in some cases a cash award. Upon the death of the recipient, the pension is transferred to the spouse until their death or remarriage. In the case of a posthumous recipient who is unmarried, the allowance is paid to their parents. In the case of the award being conferred posthumously on a widow or widower, the allowance is to be paid to their son or unmarried daughter. A monthly stipend of 20,000 is given to the awardee along with their regular pay. The award amount and pension benefits are exempted from income tax. In addition, different ministries under the central government have various financial awards for PVC winners.

A relatively unknown convention in the Indian Army is for a PVC recipient to be saluted, when in ceremonial uniform, by everyone in the Army irrespective of rank, although no legal provision exists.

Allowances by state governments
Many Indian states have established individual pension rewards that far exceed the central government's stipend for recipients of the PVC.

Memorials

A memorial has been built in the memory of PVC recipients at Marina Park, Port Blair, in Andaman and Nicobar Islands. It was inaugurated in September 2014 by the Lieutenant Governor of Andaman and Nicobar Lieutenant General Ajay Kumar Singh, in the presence of the Commander-in-Chief Andaman and Nicobar Command, Vice Admiral Pradeep Kumar Chatterjee.

On 2 May 2017, at a ceremony conducted in the National Media Center, New Delhi, Minister of State for Defence Subhash Bhamre inaugurated a campaign to build a "wall of valour" in a thousand educational institutions across the country. The campaign was initiated by the two serving receipts of PVC, Subedar Yogendra Singh Yadav and Naib Subedar Sanjay Kumar. The campaign was named “Vidya Veerta Abhiyan”. These walls are to portray all 21 recipients of the PVC along with relevant information.

Bronze Busts of all 21 recipients are installed in the Param Yodha Sthal, which is a part of the National War Memorial. The site is adjacent to the main memorial and has informative plaques displaying the citations of the heroes.

In popular culture 
The TV series Param Vir Chakra (1990), which focuses on the lives of Param Vir Chakra winners, was directed by Chetan Anand. The first episode of the series featured the first recipient of the award, Major Somnath Sharma of the Kumaon Regiment.

Indian Punjabi-language biopic movie Subedar Joginder Singh (2018) is based on Singh's life and his action during Sino-Indian War.

The Bollywood film LOC Kargil (2003) gives an account of all of the PVC recipients from the Kargil War. Lieutenant Manoj Kumar Pandey is played by Ajay Devgan, Subedar Yogendra Singh Yadav is played by Manoj Bajpayee, Naib Subedar Sanjay Kumar is played by Sunil Shetty, and Captain Vikram Batra is played by Abhishek Bachchan.

An upcoming Hindi-language film Ekkis will focus on the life on Arun Khetarpal, who is the youngest recipient of the award.

In the 2021 film Shershaah, Sidharth Malhotra played Vikram Batra in a biopic directed by Vishnuvardhan.

Notes

Footnotes

Citations

References

External links 

 
 
 

Civil awards and decorations of India
Military awards and decorations of India
Awards established in 1950
Indian awards
1950 establishments in India

Courage awards